L'Shana Haba'ah B'Yerushalayim, lit. "Next year in Jerusalem", is a phrase that is often sung at the end of the Passover Seder and at the end of the Ne'ila service on Yom Kippur. Its use during Passover was first recorded by Isaac Tyrnau in his 15th century CE book cataloging the Minhaggim of various Ashkenazi communities.

L'Shana Haba'ah evokes a common theme in Jewish culture of a desire to return to a rebuilt Jerusalem, and commentators have suggested that it serves as a reminder of the experience of living in exile.

Background
Jews living in the Diaspora pray "Next Year in Jerusalem!" each year at the end of Passover and Yom Kippur. After the destruction of the Jewish temple, the hope of seeing it rebuilt became a central component of Jewish religious consciousness and the most common way religious Jews have expressed hope for future redemption. An inversion of the phrase ("") is seen in Joseph Ibn Abitur's 10th century poem "A'amir Mistatter", which is found in the Cairo Geniza and appears in many Ashkenazic Makhzors as a prayer for the Shabbat before Passover. Isaac ibn Ghiyyat's poem "Yedidekha me-Emesh" contains the phrase in its more common wording (""). Isaac Tyrnau in the 15th century CE was the first to write of recitation of the phrase during Passover. The phase is not found in works such as the Tanakh, the Talmud or any of the Haggadot of the Rishonim period such as Rashi and Rabbeinu Tam.

The Talmud is replete with statements affirming the superior religious status of the Holy Land, the obligation of Jews to live there, and the confidence in the ultimate collective return of the Jewish people.

Jewish belief posits that although the Temple in Jerusalem was destroyed twice, it will be rebuilt a third time, ushering in the Messianic era and the ingathering of the exiles. Some Jewish rituals express the desire to witness those events, couched in the phrase L'Shana Haba'ah B'Yerushalayim ("Next year in Jerusalem"). For example, the Passover Seder concludes with L'Shana Haba'ah B'Yerushalayim, and the fifth and final prayer service of Yom Kippur, Ne'ila, concludes with the blowing of a shofar and the recitation of L'Shana Haba'ah B'Yerushalayim. In Israel, Jews often add an additional word to the phrase: L'Shana Haba'ah B'Yerushalayim habnuyah ("Next year in the rebuilt Jerusalem").

Symbolism
Ross has suggested that the recitation L'Shana Haba'ah serves as a reminder of the personal experience of exile that "we need to reconcile in order to truly be in Jerusalem, a city whose name suggests peace (shalom) and completeness (shaleim)". Berg has also suggested that the recitation of L'Shana Haba'ah "unite[s] the Jews as a people" because it is a reminder of the shared experience of living in exile, and some scholars have noted that the purpose of reciting L'Shana Haba'ah at the end of the Ne'ila prayers on Yom Kippur is to express "our deep felt yearning to reunite with the Shechinah in the rebuilt Yerushalayim". Dosick has also suggested that L'Shana Haba'ah is both a prayer "for an end to exile and return to the Land of Israel" as well as "a prayer for ultimate redemption, for peace and perfection for the entire world".

See also 
 Jerusalem in Judaism
 Passover songs
 Yom HaAliyah

References

Citations

General bibliography 

 
 
 
 
 
 
 
 
 
 
 
 
 

Haggadah of Pesach
Hebrew words and phrases in Jewish law
Hebrew words and phrases in Jewish prayers and blessings
Jerusalem
Jewish diaspora
Yom Kippur